Neuropathix, Inc. is a biopharmaceutical company based in Doylestown, Pennsylvania focused on the research and development of pain management and neuroprotective therapeutics. 

In 2016, through the company's subsidiary Kannalife, Neuropathix discovered KLS-13019 along with other therapeutic agents that prevent neuropathic pain, mitochondrial dysfunction, reduce oxidative stress, and act as anti-inflammatory neuroprotectants. Both KLS-13019 and cannabidiol, prevented the development of CIPN, while only KLS-13019 uniquely reversed neuropathic pain from chemotherapy. KLS-13019 binds to fewer biological targets than cannabidiol and KLS-13019 may possess the unique ability to reverse addictive behaviour, an effect not observed with cannabidiol. Neuropathix family of monotherapeutic small molecules are focused on treating oxidative stress-related diseases, inflammation, chronic pain management and neurodegenerative disorders.

In late 2021, Neuropathix subsidiary Kannalife, was awarded a non-dilutive three-year $2.97 Million grant from the National Institute of Neurological Disorders and Stroke (NINDS) and National Institutes of Health (NIH). The three-year study grant is funded through the NIH HEAL Initiative (Helping End Addiction Long-term) for enhanced pain management and provides funding specifically in the Development of KLS-13019 for Neuropathic Pain.

Neuropathix is currently conducting research and development at the Pennsylvania Biotechnology Center of Bucks County to treat Chemotherapy-induced peripheral neuropathy, Hepatic encephalopathy, Mild Traumatic Brain Injury and CTE.

References

External links

Health care companies based in Pennsylvania
Companies based in Bucks County, Pennsylvania
Pharmaceutical companies of the United States
Social_responsibility
Corporate_social_responsibility
Social_responsibility_organizations
Cannabis research